The 2014 Faroe Islands Cup was the 60th edition of Faroe Islands domestic football cup. It started on 15 March and ended with the final on 30 August 2014. Víkingur were the defending champions, having won their third cup title the previous year, and successfully defended their title. As the winner of the competition, they qualified for the first qualifying round of the 2015–16 UEFA Europa League.

Only the first teams of Faroese football clubs were allowed to participate. The Preliminary round involved only clubs from 2. deild and 3. deild. Teams from 1. deild and Effodeildin entered the competition in the First round.

Participating clubs

TH – Title Holders

Round and draw dates

Source: Competition calendar at the FSF website

Preliminary round
The four clubs from 2. deild entered this round. The draw was made on 3 March and the matches took place on 15 March.

|}

Results

First round
All ten clubs from Effodeildin, three from 1. deild, one from 3. deild and the two winners of Preliminary round entered this round. The matches were played on 5 and 6 April.

|}

Results

Quarter-finals
The draw was made on 7 April. The matches were played on 27 April and 7 May.

|}

Results

Note

Semi-finals
The draw was made on 28 April. The matches were played over two legs on 21 May, 5 and 18 June.

|}

First legs

Note

Second legs

Final

Top goalscorers

References

External links
Cup in Faroe Soccer

Faroe Islands Cup seasons
Cup
Faroe Islands Cup